William Richard Dickinson (October 26, 1931July 21, 2015) was a professor emeritus of geoscience at the University of Arizona and a member of the U.S. National Academy of Sciences.  Prior joining the University of Arizona, Dickinson was a professor at Stanford University.  He joined the U of A faculty in 1979.

Early life
Dickinson was born near Nashville, Tennessee in 1931, and grew up in Travellers Rest, a historic plantation house built by his  great-great-grandfather Judge John Overton in 1799. Dickinson's family operated an Arabian horse farm on the property until 1946, when they relocated the family and horse farm to Santa Barbara, California. Dickinson's experience as a young adult riding on horseback through the nearby Santa Ynez Mountains, and observing the geography, inspired his interest in geology. Dickinson enrolled at Stanford University in 1948, and graduated with a Bachelor's of Science in petroleum engineering in 1952 and a Ph.D in geology in 1958.

Career
Dickinson was renowned for his work in plate tectonics, sedimentary geology and Pacific Oceana geology and was considered one of the foremost experts on the geology of the Colorado Plateau.  Dickinson was one of the founders of the Gazzi-Dickinson Method and its primary application, QFL diagrams and their use in sandstone provenance.

Dickinson's research includes studying the potsherds (historic or prehistoric fragments of pottery) of Pacific Oceana. Over the years, he visited hundreds of Pacific Islands collecting and dating sherds.

In later life, Dickinson resided in Tucson, Arizona, where he continued to do research and teach at the University of Arizona. He died on July 21, 2015 while on a field expedition to Nuku'alofa, Tonga.

Awards
1991, awarded the Penrose Medal by the Geological Society of America
2001, awarded the William H. Twenhofel Medal by the Society for Sedimentary Geology
2014, awarded the Rip Rapp Award for Archaeological Geology of the Geological Society of America

References

External links
William Dickinson's page at the National Academy of Sciences
William Dickinson at the U of A

Members of the United States National Academy of Sciences
American geologists
Penrose Medal winners
Stanford University Department of Geology faculty
University of Arizona faculty
1931 births
2015 deaths
Presidents of the Geological Society of America